HMS Bounty, also known as HM Armed Vessel Bounty, was a small merchant vessel that the Royal Navy purchased in 1787 for a botanical mission. The ship was sent to the South Pacific Ocean under the command of William Bligh to acquire breadfruit plants and transport them to the West Indies to be grown as food to feed the West Indies' large population of enslaved persons. That mission was never completed owing to a 1789 mutiny led by acting lieutenant Fletcher Christian, an incident now popularly known as the Mutiny on the Bounty. The mutineers later burned Bounty while she was moored at Pitcairn Island in the Southern Pacific Ocean in 1790. An American adventurer helped land several remains of Bounty in 1957.

Origin and description
Bounty was originally a collier, Bethia, reputedly built in 1784 at Blaydes Yard in Hull, Yorkshire in England. The Royal Navy purchased her for £1,950 on 23 May 1787, refit, and renamed her Bounty. The ship was relatively small at 215 tons, but had three masts and was full-rigged. After conversion for the breadfruit expedition, she was equipped with four  cannon and ten swivel guns.

1787 breadfruit expedition

Preparations
The Royal Navy had purchased Bethia for a single mission in support of slavery in the British West Indies: an experiment to acquire breadfruit plants from Tahiti, and to transport those plants to the West Indies in the hope that they would grow well there and become a cheap source of food for enslaved persons. Sugar was cultivated under conditions so harsh and extreme (even as compared to other slave-produced crops) that enslaved people survived an average of just seven years following arrival on West Indies plantations.

Sir Joseph Banks had proposed the experiment and had recommended Lieutenant William Bligh R.N. as commander. Bligh in turn was promoted through a prize offered by the Royal Society of Arts.

In June 1787, Bounty was refitted at Deptford. The great cabin was converted to house the potted breadfruit plants, and gratings were fitted to the upper deck. William Bligh was appointed Commanding Lieutenant on 16 August 1787 at the age of 33, after a career that included a tour as sailing master of James Cook's  during Cook's third and final voyage (1776–1780). The ship's complement was 46 men: a single commissioned officer (Bligh), 43 other Royal Navy personnel, and two civilian gardeners.

Voyage out
On 23 December 1787, Bounty sailed from Spithead for Tahiti. For a full month, the crew attempted to take the ship west, around South America's Cape Horn, but adverse weather prevented this. Bligh then proceeded east, rounding the southern tip of Africa (Cape Agulhas) and crossing the width of the Indian Ocean. During the outward voyage, Bligh demoted Sailing Master John Fryer, replacing him with Fletcher Christian. This act seriously damaged the relationship between Bligh and Fryer, and Fryer later claimed that Bligh's act was entirely personal.

Bligh is commonly portrayed as the epitome of abusive sailing captains, but this portrayal has recently come into dispute. Caroline Alexander points out in her 2003 book The Bounty that Bligh was relatively lenient compared with other British naval officers. Bligh enjoyed the patronage of Sir Joseph Banks, a wealthy botanist and influential figure in Britain at the time. That, together with his experience sailing with Cook, familiarity with navigation in the area, and local customs were probably important factors in his appointment.

Bounty reached Tahiti, then called "Otaheite", on 26 October 1788, after ten months at sea. The crew spent five months there collecting and preparing 1,015 breadfruit plants to be transported. Bligh allowed the crew to live ashore and care for the potted breadfruit plants, and they became socialised to the customs and culture of the Tahitians. Many of the seamen and some of the "young gentlemen" had themselves tattooed in native fashion. Master's Mate and Acting Lieutenant Fletcher Christian married Maimiti, a Tahitian woman.  Other warrant officers and seamen were also said to have formed "connections" with native women.

Mutiny and destruction of the ship

After five months in Tahiti, Bounty set sail with her breadfruit cargo on 4 April 1789. Despite strong words and threats heard on both sides, the ship was taken bloodlessly and apparently without struggle by any of the loyalists except Bligh himself. Of the 42 men on board aside from Bligh and Christian, 22 joined Christian in mutiny, two were passive, and 18 remained loyal to Bligh.

The mutineers ordered Bligh, two midshipmen, the surgeon's mate (Ledward), and the ship's clerk into the ship's boat. Several more men voluntarily joined Bligh rather than remain aboard. Bligh and his men sailed the open boat  to Tofua in search of supplies, but were forced to flee after attacks by hostile natives resulted in the death of one of the men.

He safely landed there 47 days later, having lost no men during the voyage except the one killed on Tofua.

The mutineers sailed for the island of Tubuai, where they tried to settle. After three months of bloody conflict with the natives, however, they returned to Tahiti. Sixteen of the mutineers – including the four loyalists who had been unable to accompany Bligh – remained there, taking their chances that the Royal Navy would not find them and bring them to justice.

 was sent out by the Admiralty in November 1790 in pursuit of Bounty, to capture the mutineers and bring them back to Britain to face a court martial. She arrived in March 1791 and captured fourteen men within two weeks; they were locked away in a makeshift wooden prison on Pandoras quarterdeck. The men called their cell "Pandora's box". They remained in their prison until 29 August 1791 when Pandora was wrecked on the Great Barrier Reef with the loss of 35 lives, including four mutineers (Stewart, Sumner, Skinner, and Hildebrand).

Immediately after setting the sixteen men ashore in Tahiti in September 1789, Fletcher Christian, eight other crewmen, six Tahitian men, and 11 women, one with a baby, set sail in Bounty hoping to elude the Royal Navy. According to a journal kept by one of Christian's followers, the Tahitians were actually kidnapped when Christian set sail without warning them, the purpose of this being to acquire the women. The mutineers passed through the Fiji and Cook Islands, but feared that they would be found there.

Continuing their quest for a safe haven, on 15 January 1790 they rediscovered Pitcairn Island, which had been misplaced on the Royal Navy's charts. After the decision was made to settle on Pitcairn, livestock and other provisions were removed from Bounty. To prevent the ship's detection, and anyone's possible escape, the ship was burned on 23 January 1790 in what is now called Bounty Bay.

The mutineers remained undetected on Pitcairn until February 1808, when sole remaining mutineer John Adams and the surviving Tahitian women and their children were discovered by the Boston sealer Topaz, commanded by Captain Mayhew Folger of Nantucket, Massachusetts. Adams gave to Folger the Bounty azimuth compass and marine chronometer.

Seventeen years later, in 1825, on a voyage of exploration under Captain Frederick William Beechey, arrived on Christmas Day off Pitcairn and spent 19 days there. Beechey later recorded this in his 1831 published account of the voyage, as did one of his crew, John Bechervaise, in his 1839 Thirty-Six Years of a Seafaring Life by an Old Quarter Master. Beechey wrote a detailed account of the mutiny as recounted to him by the last survivor, Adams. Bechervaise, who described the life of the islanders, says he found the remains of Bounty and took some pieces of wood from it which were turned into souvenirs such as snuff boxes.

Mission details

The details of the voyage of Bounty are very well documented, largely due to the effort of Bligh to maintain an accurate log before, during, and after the actual mutiny.  Bountys crew list is also well chronicled, down to and including the names of every seaman on board, something which larger ships in the rating system only occasionally were capable of due to crews in the hundreds, whereas Bounty carried fewer than fifty personnel.

Bligh's original log remained intact throughout his ordeal and was used as a major piece of evidence in his own trial for the loss of Bounty, as well as the subsequent trial of captured mutineers. The original log is presently maintained at the State Library of New South Wales, with available transcripts in both print and electronic format.

Mission log
 1787
 16 August: William Bligh is ordered to command a breadfruit gathering expedition to Tahiti
 3 September: Bounty launched from the drydock at Deptford
 4–9 October: Bounty navigated with a partial crew to an ammunition loading station, south of Deptford
 10–12 October: Onload of arms and weapons at Long Reach
 15 October – 4 November: Navigated to Spithead for final crew and stores onload
 29 November: Made anchor at St Helens, Isle of Wight
 23 December: Departed English waters for Tahiti
 1788
 5–10 January: Anchored off Tenerife, Canary Islands
 5 February: Crossed equator at 21.50 degrees West
 26 February: Marked at 100 leagues from the eastern coast of Brazil
 23 March: Arrived Tierra del Fuego
 9 April: Entered the Strait of Magellan
 25 April: Abandoned attempt to round Cape Horn and turned east
 22 May: Within sight of the Cape of Good Hope
 24 May – 29 June: Anchored at Simon's Bay
 28 July: Within sight of Saint Paul's Island, west of Van Diemen's Land
 20 August – 2 September: Anchored Van Diemen's Land
 19 September: Past the southern tip of New Zealand
 26 October: Arrived Tahiti
 25 December: Shifted mooring to "Toahroah" harbour, Pare "Oparre", Tahiti. Bounty ran aground.
 1789
 4 April: Weighed anchor from the harbour at Pare, Tahiti
 23–25 April: Anchored for provisions off Annamooka (Tonga)
 26 April: Departed Annamooka for the West Indies
 28 April: Mutiny – Captain Bligh and loyal crew members set adrift in Bounty launch
 From this point, Bligh's mission log reflects the voyage of the Bounty launch towards the Dutch East Indies
 29 April: Bounty launch arrives at Tofua
 2 May: Bounty launch castaways flee Tofua after being attacked by natives
 28 May: Landfall on a small island north of New Hebrides. Named "Restoration Island" by Captain Bligh
 30–31 May: Bounty launch transits to a second nearby island, named "Sunday Island"
 1–2 June: Bounty launch transits 42 miles to a third island, named "Turtle Island"
 3 June: Bounty launch sails into the open ocean towards Australia
 13 June: Bounty launch lands at Timor
 14 June: Launch castaways circle Timor and land at Coupang.  Mutiny is reported to Dutch authorities
 Bligh's mission log from this point reflects his return to England onboard various merchant vessels and sailing ships
 20 August – 10 September: Sailed via schooner to Pasuruan, Java
 11–12 September: In transit to Surabaya
 15–17 September: In transit to the town of Crissey, Madura Strait
 18–22 September: In transit to Semarang
 26 September – 1 October: In transit to Batavia (Jakarta)
 16 October: Sailed for Europe on board the Dutch packet SS Vlydte
 16 December: Arrived Cape of Good Hope
 1790
 13 January: Sailed from Cape of Good Hope for England
 13 March: Arrived Portsmouth Harbour

Crew list

In the immediate wake of the mutiny, all but four of the loyal crew joined Bligh in the long boat for the voyage to Timor, and eventually made it safely back to England, unless otherwise noted in the table below. Four were detained against their will on Bounty for their needed skills and for lack of space on the long boat. The mutineers first returned to Tahiti, where most of the survivors were later captured by Pandora and taken to England for trial. Nine mutineers continued their flight from the law and eventually settled on Pitcairn Island, where all but one died before their fate became known to the outside world.

Discovery of the wreck

Luis Marden rediscovered the remains of Bounty in January 1957. After spotting remains of the rudder (which had been found in 1933 by Parkin Christian, and is still displayed in the Fiji Museum in Suva), he persuaded his editors and writers to let him dive off Pitcairn Island, where the rudder had been found. Despite the warnings of one islander"Man, you gwen be dead as a hatchet!"Marden dived for several days in the dangerous swells near the island, and found the remains of the ship: a rudder pin, nails, a ships boat oarlock, fittings and a Bounty anchor that he raised. He subsequently met with Marlon Brando to counsel him on his role as Fletcher Christian in the 1962 film Mutiny on the Bounty. Later in life, Marden wore cuff links made of nails from Bounty. Marden also dived on the wreck of Pandora and left a Bounty nail with Pandora.

Some of the Bountys remains, such as the ballast stones, are still partially visible in the waters of Bounty Bay.

The last of Bountys four 4-pounder cannon was recovered in 1998 by an archaeological team from James Cook University and was sent to the Queensland Museum in Townsville to be stabilised through lengthy conservation treatment via electrolysis over a period of nearly 40 months. The gun was subsequently returned to Pitcairn Island, where it has been placed on display in a new community hall.  Several other pieces of the ship were found but local law forbids removal of such items from the island.

Modern reconstructions

When the 1935 film Mutiny on the Bounty was made, sailing vessels (often with assisting engines) were partly still in use and existing vessels were adapted to play Bounty and Pandora.

For the 1962 film, a new Bounty was constructed in 1960 in Nova Scotia. For much of 1962 to 2012, she was owned by a not-for-profit organisation whose primary aim was to sail her and other square rigged sailing ships, and she sailed the world to appear at harbours for inspections, and take paying passengers, to recoup running costs. For long voyages, she took on volunteer crew.

On 29 October 2012, sixteen Bounty crew members abandoned ship off the coast of North Carolina after getting caught in the high seas brought on by Hurricane Sandy. The ship sank, according to Coast Guard Air Station Elizabeth City, at 12:45 UTC Monday 29 October 2012 and two crew members, including Captain Robin Walbridge, were reported as missing. The captain was not found and presumed dead on 2 November 2012. It was later reported that the Coast Guard had recovered one of the missing crew members, Claudene Christian, descendant of Fletcher Christian of the original Bounty.  Christian was found to be unresponsive and pronounced dead on arrival at a hospital in North Carolina.

A second Bounty replica, named HMAV Bounty, was built in New Zealand in 1979 and used in the 1984 film The Bounty. The hull is constructed of welded steel oversheathed with timber. For many years she served the tourist excursion market from Darling Harbour, Sydney, Australia and appeared in a Tamil language Indian (1996 film), before being sold to HKR International Limited in October 2007. She was then a tourist attraction (also used for charter, excursions and sail training) based in Discovery Bay, on Lantau Island in Hong Kong, and was given an additional Chinese name . She was decommissioned on 1 August 2017. The company has not disclosed the ship's fate.

References

External links 

 Photo gallery of HMS Bounty replica at Tall Ships Nova Scotia 2009 and 2012. 

 
1784 ships
1957 archaeological discoveries
Full-rigged ships
History of the Pitcairn Islands
History of the Royal Navy
Individual sailing vessels
Mutiny on the Bounty
Ships built on the Humber
Replica ships
Maritime incidents in 1790